George Brown (22 June 1903 – 10 June 1948) was an English professional footballer and football manager, who played most of his career with Huddersfield Town.

Playing career

A centre-forward, he was the highest ever goal-scorer for Huddersfield Town with 159 goals; 142 in the League in 213 appearances and 17 from 16 outings in the FA Cup. Signed straight from his pit team at Mickley in May 1921, he was eventually sold to Aston Villa in August 1929 for £5,000.

For Villa he scored a total of 89 goals in 126 games.

During his career he scored 273 goals in 440 games, between 1921 and 1938, after which he retired to run a pub. He gained 9 full England caps and represented the Football League once.

Honours

As a player 
Huddersfield Town
FA Charity Shield winner: 1922
Division 1 champions: 1923–24, 1924–25, 1925–26
Division 1 runners-up: 1926–27, 1927–28
FA Cup finalist: 1928

Managerial statistics

References

External links

Aston Villa profile
Profile on www.englandstats.com
Profile on www.englandfc.com 

1903 births
1948 deaths
English footballers
Association football forwards
English Football League players
England international footballers
Aston Villa F.C. players
Burnley F.C. players
Darlington F.C. players
Huddersfield Town A.F.C. players
Leeds United F.C. players
English football managers
Darlington F.C. managers
English Football League representative players
People from Mickley, Northumberland
Footballers from Northumberland
FA Cup Final players